The 1911 Georgia Bulldogs football team represented the Georgia Bulldogs of the University of Georgia during the 1911 college football season. The Bulldogs completed the season with a 7–1–1 record.   The only blemishes on the season were a loss to Vanderbilt and a tie with Auburn.  Vanderbilt went on to win its second straight SIAA conference title.  The season provided second consecutive victories over Alabama and Georgia Tech and the first victory in a number of years against Sewanee. The captain of the 1911 team and one of the star players was quarterback George Cecil Woodruff.  Woodruff became the third Georgia player to later become head coach of the Bulldogs when he assumed that role in 1923.

The 1911 season was Georgia's 20th football season.  After 20 years of football, the Bulldogs had played 127 games and had a 60–55–12 record (.520 winning percentage).

Schedule

References

Georgia
Georgia Bulldogs football seasons
Georgia Bulldogs football